Karulina Kare is a 1970 Kannada-language romantic drama film directed and written by Puttanna Kanagal. The film stars Rajkumar, Kalpana and R. Nagendra Rao. The film was remade in Telugu in 1972-73 as Pedda Koduku starring Sobhan Babu.

The film went on to win the Best Editing and Best Sound recording awards in the Karnataka State Awards for the year 1970–71.

Cast 
 Rajkumar as Parameshi
 Kalpana as Parvati
 R. Nagendra Rao as Subbanna, Parameshi's foster father
 R. N. Sudarshan as Mohan
 Dinesh as Raja / Soorappa
 Renuka as Uma
 Advani Lakshmi Devi as Gowri
 H. R. Shastry
 Sathyavathi as Shanti
 Rathnakar
 M. S. Subbanna
 Bangalore Nagesh
 Mala (credited as Baby Mala)
 Ravikanth (credited as Master Ravikanth) as young Parameshi

Soundtrack 
The music was composed by M. Ranga Rao with lyrics by R. N. Jayagopal. All the songs composed for the film were received extremely well and considered as evergreen songs.

Awards

Karnataka State Film Awards
 Best Editor - S. P. N. Krishna
 Best Sound Recording - P. J. Lakshman

References

External links 
 

1970 films
1970 romantic drama films
1970s Kannada-language films
Indian romantic drama films
Films directed by Puttanna Kanagal
Indian black-and-white films
Films scored by M. Ranga Rao
Kannada films remade in other languages